So Elva is the sixth studio album by Taiwanese singer Elva Hsiao, released on 16 May 2003 by Virgin Records Taiwan.

Track listing
 "我就是我 (Remix)" (I Am Me)
 "進行式" (Walk Style)
 "開始愛" (Love Start)
 "愛情專用" (Exclusive for Love)
 "一輩子做你的女孩" (Your Girl for Life)
 "愛上愛" (In Love with Love)
 "想到你" (Think of You)
 "原始" (Beginning)
 "不配" (Not Worth)
 "魔術" (Magic)
 "我就是我" (I Am Me)

References

2003 albums
Elva Hsiao albums